Channa striata, the striped snakehead, is a species of snakehead fish. It is also known as the common snakehead, chevron snakehead, or snakehead murrel and generally referred simply as mudfish. It is native to South and Southeast Asia, and has been introduced to some Pacific Islands. Reports from Madagascar and Hawaii are misidentifications of C. maculata.

A genetic study published in 2017 indicates that C. striata is a species complex.

Description
It is a bony fish with endoskeleton ribcage, grows up to a meter in length, though because of fishing, this size is rarely found in the wild. It has a widespread range covering southern China, Pakistan, most of India, southern Nepal, Bangladesh, Sri Lanka, and most of Southeast Asia. It has more recently been introduced to the outermost parts of Indonesia, the Philippines, and Mauritius. Reports beginning in the early 20th century that it was introduced into the wild in Hawaii, particularly the island of Oahu, as well as later reports from Madagascar, are the result of misidentifications of C. maculata. The only currently confirmed Hawaiian establishment of C. striata is on a commercial fish farm.  Popular media and the United States Fish and Wildlife Service were perpetuating this apparent mistake as recently as 2002. Early- to mid-20th century reports and texts referring to its introduction in California appear to be the result of a misunderstanding.

It is an important food fish in its entire native range, and is of considerable economic importance. Adults are dark brown in colour with faint black bands visible across its entire body. Males and females both help to construct a nest out of water vegetation during breeding time. Eggs are guarded by both parents. Fry are reddish orange and are guarded by both parents until they turn greenish brown at around 5–6 cm.

It is common in freshwater plains, where it migrates from rivers and lakes into flooded fields. Subsequently, it returns to permanent water bodies in the dry season, where it survives by burrowing in the mud.

It preys on frogs, water bugs, and smaller fish, and it will attack anything moving when breeding.

Nomenclature
Common snakeheads are known as ngayan in Burmese; Nga-mu porom in Meitei, xól/xol (শ’ল/শল) in Assamese, Garai (गरई) in North Indian Languages, shol (শোল) in Bengali,"sol" (سول) in Urdu, Pakistan, Sheula (ଶେଉଳ) in Odia, varaal (വരാല്)) in Kerala, India; viral/mural/selumural/nedumural (in Tamil: விரால்,முறால்,செலுமுரல்,நெடுமுரல்) in Tamil Nadu, India; "poochepa" Koramenu/Korra matta, India;  Madenji (Tulu: ಮಡೆಂಜಿ) in Tulu Nadu, India; and Loola   ලූලා in Sri Lanka; trey ross (Khmer: ត្រីរ៉ស់), pla chon in Thailand; gabus in Indonesia; haruan in Malaysia; dalak in Brunei  and haloan, aruan, haruan, in Malay, cá lóc đồng in Vietnamese,  生鱼, 泰国鳢 in Chinese , halwan, bulig, dalag, turagsoy or "mudfish" in the Philippines.

Culinary

A curry made with this fish and tapioca is a delicacy in Kerala. In Indonesia, common snakeheads are a popular type of salted fishes in Indonesian cuisine. In the Philippines, they are commonly served either fried, grilled, paksiw (poached in a water-vinegar mix), or with soup (commonly cooked with rice washing).

Dishes using this fish eaten with rice is very popular among Bengalis of West Bengal and Bangladesh.  The fish is also an esteemed delicacy in other parts of India, including Andhra Pradesh, Tamilnadu and Kerala.

Common snakeheads are very popular in Thai cuisine, where they are prepared in a variety of ways. Grilled fish is a common food item offered by street vendors or in kaeng som. Pla ra, a fermented fish sauce popular in northeastern Thai cuisine, is made by pickling common snakehead and keeping it for some time. Also, a Chinese sausage is prepared with common snakehead flesh in Thailand.

According to traditional Chinese medicine theories, all snakehead fishes are helpful with wound healing, especially when boiled into soup, which made snakehead fishes a popular choice of food in sinosphere.

Immune system

Worldwide inland fish culture industry is suffering from massive economic losses due to epizootic ulcerative syndrome (EUS) and fish-based pathogens. The available literature indicate that infection from fish pathogens like bacteria (Aeromonas hydrophila and Aeromonas sobria), fungi (Aphanomyces invadans) and viruses can cause stunted growth and severe mortality in the C. striatus. Channa striatus rely on their innate immune components to fight against these infections. Some of the immune molecules that have been characterized in Channa striatus includes Chemokine, Chemokine receptors, Thioredoxin, Superoxide dismutase, Serine Protease, Cathepsin, Lectin.

In culture
The Bathini Goud Brothers in Hyderabad, India, promote the swallowing of live murrel fish and herbs claimed as a treatment for asthma, although the high court ruled they cannot call it "medicine". They give it free to children on Mrigasira Nakshatra. No evidence indicates it is clinically effective, and children's rights campaigners have called for it to be banned.

References

External links

 
 
 

striata
Fish of Southeast Asia
Fish of Thailand
Fish of Bangladesh
Fish of Pakistan
Fish of the Philippines
Fish described in 1793